Ivo Papazov (or Papasov; ; born 1952), nicknamed Ibryama, is a Bulgarian clarinetist. He leads the "Ivo Papazov Wedding Band" in performances of jazz-infused Stambolovo music, and is one of the premier creators of the genre known as "wedding band" music in Bulgaria, along with the violinist Georgi Yanev, saxophonist Yuri Yunakov, clarinetist Neshko Neshev and accordionists Ivan Milev and Peter Ralchev. Together with Emilia they are known as Mames 2001. An orchestra that had great success in the TV show Познай кой е под масата ("Guess who is under the table").

According to Garth Cartwright, he was "the first Balkan Gypsy musician to win a wide international following with his two Joe Boyd-produced albums for Hannibal Records in the early 1990s." Papazov and his Wedding Band have toured the United States several times.

In 2005, Papazov won the Audience Award from the BBC's Radio3 World Music Awards.

Papazov and Yuri Yunakov are briefly profiled and the recording of "Kurdzhaliiska Ruchenica" from their 2005 album Together Again is analyzed in the popular textbook, Worlds of Music, 5th Edition.

Ivo Papazov is a Bulgarian Roma and his original name is Ibrahim (Turkish name). Papazov has stated: "I am one of the few light skinned people in my family but I know I am Romani." As a result of the extensive programme of forced nationalisation of ethnic minority groups during Bulgaria's socialist rule, Papazov changed his first name to Ivo (adapted from Ibo, short for Ibrahim). He speaks Turkish and comes from Kardzhali, a city close to Bulgaria’s Turkish and Greek borders. He grew up in a musical family and followed the Balkan Gypsy tradition of leaving school at a young age, in his case to focus on playing music for a living.

Selected discography
 Ivo Papasov and His Bulgarian Wedding Band - Orpheus Ascending (Hannibal, 1989)

Contributing artist
The Rough Guide to the Music of Eastern Europe (World Music Network, 1999)

References

External links

Article on BBC's Radio3 World Music Awards

1952 births
Living people
Bulgarian people of Romani descent
Bulgarian clarinetists
People from Kardzhali
Bulgarian folk musicians
21st-century clarinetists